Perellos Redoubt was a redoubt in Salina Bay, limits of St. Paul's Bay, Malta. It was built by the Order of Saint John in 1715-1716 as one of a series of coastal fortifications around the coasts of the Maltese Islands. It was demolished after the Second World War.

History

Perellos Redoubt was built between 1715 and 1716 as part of the Order of Saint John's first building program of coastal fortifications. It was one of two redoubts defending Salina Bay. The redoubt on the other side of the bay, known as Ximenes Redoubt, is still intact.

The redoubt was named after Grand Master Ramon Perellos y Roccaful. The redoubt consisted of a pre-existing mandrague which was converted into a blockhouse, and a rectangular enclosure with a high parapet wall designed to protect infantrymen. The latter was similar to the design of Ximenes Redoubt, but it also had a small bastion on a corner of its perimeter wall.

After 1741, a fougasse was built inside the redoubt. In 1785 it did not have any armament, equipment or munitions.

A concrete beach post was built over the remains of the redoubt in World War II. The remains were demolished after the war, and the site of the redoubt is now occupied by boat houses. The fougasse possibly still exists buried under these boat houses.

References

External links
National Inventory of the Cultural Property of the Maltese Islands

Redoubts in Malta
St. Paul's Bay
Hospitaller fortifications in Malta
Military installations established in 1715
Demolished buildings and structures in Malta
Limestone buildings in Malta
National Inventory of the Cultural Property of the Maltese Islands
Buildings and structures demolished in the 20th century
18th-century fortifications
1715 establishments in Malta
18th Century military history of Malta